Catch the Wind: Songs of a Generation is the second studio album (first cover album) by Australian Idol 2006 winner Damien Leith. It was released on 26 April 2008.

The album features 18 songs of Leith's interpretations from the 1960s and 1970s that inspired and captured his spirit at a young age. "The great songwriters of the 60s and 70s have always been a major influence on my own original material. In many ways the songs of that generation are as relevant today as they were back then. I've chosen songs that either mean a great deal to me on a personal level or those that I'd just love people to hear."

The album debuted at number three on the Australian ARIA Albums Chart, selling 9,688 copies in its first week. In the following week, in the lead up to Mother's Day, the album rose to number two. Selling over 17,000 units, the album lost the top position by less than 300 copies.

Track listing 

 "Catch the Wind" (Donovan) – 2:19
 "Annie's Song" (John Denver) – 2:30
 "Wild World" (Cat Stevens) – 3:31
 "If" (David Gates) – 3:16
 "The Times They Are a-Changin'" (Bob Dylan) – 3:00
 "Father and Son" (Stevens) – 3:20
 "Vincent" (Don McLean) – 4:14
 "Everybody's Talkin'" (Harry Nilsson) – 4:03
 "Universal Soldier" (Buffy Sainte-Marie) – 2:18
 "Guitar Man" (Gates) – 3:28
 "Baby, I Love Your Way" (Peter Frampton) – 3:09
 "Only Love Can Break Your Heart" (Neil Young) – 3:34
 "Longer" (Dan Fogelberg) – 2:56
 "Blowin' in the Wind" (Dylan) – 3:02
 "Old Man" (Young) – 2:49
 "And I Love You So" (McLean) – 3:03
 "Sunshine on My Shoulders" (Denver) – 4:20
 "Time in a Bottle" (Jim Croce) – 3:02

Personnel 

 David Anderson – Photography
 Glenn A. Baker – Liner Notes
 Jenifer Carmody – A&R
 James Patrick Cooper – Art Direction, Design
 Ross Fraser – Producer, A&R
 Paul Gray – Keyboards, Vocals (background), Producer
 Esther Coleman Hawkins – Choir Master
 Damien Leith – Guitar, Vocals, Producer
 Greg Royal – Bass
 Eric Aranda - Guitars

Charts

Certification

Year-end charts

References 

2008 albums
Damien Leith albums
Sony BMG albums